The VTV-T&T Cup was an invitational football tournament organised by the Vietnam Football Federation, and sponsored by the T&T Technology and Commerce Ltd. in a US$126,000 deal.. Apart from host nation  Vietnam, under 23 teams from  Australia,  Iran and  Uzbekistan were also invited to compete in the tournament. The tournament commenced on 16 April 2006 to 20 April 2006.

The tournament winner received US$40,000 in prize money, while the second and third place teams were awarded US$20,000 and $10,000 respectively.

Champion
  Iran U23

Results

External links
 Spring Cup pits Vietnam against three strong visitors
 Spring Cup renamed VTV-T&T Cup

2006
2006 in Vietnamese football
2006 in Australian soccer
2006 in Uzbekistani football
2005–06 in Iranian football